SV Braunsbedra is a German association football club from the town of Braunsbedra, Saxony-Anhalt and is part of a larger sports club. The club's greatest success was promotion to the then fourth-tier NOFV-Oberliga Süd in 2001 for only one season.

History 
The club started in 1950 as predecessor BSG Aktivist Geiseltal Mücheln when SG Neumark and SG Mücheln combined, then it was renamed Aktivist Geiseltal-Mitte in 1960. Throughout most of its existence Aktivist played in the lower leagues of Halle district with the exception of a five-season stint in the then third-tier II. DDR-Liga. The club took on a new name as SV Braunsbedra after absorbing Chemie Lützkendorf following German reunification.

SV first competed in the Verbandsliga Sachsen-Anhalt (IV) for the 1995–96 season and six seasons have passed when a championship there propelled the team to their NOFV-Oberliga Süd debut campaign which ended in an uninspiring 17th and last place. Since then they have descended from the Verbandsliga and, from 2007, to Landesliga (VII) levels.

Honors 
Verbandsliga Sachsen-Anhalt
 Winners: 2001

References

External links 
Club site 

Football clubs in Germany
Football clubs in East Germany
Football clubs in Saxony-Anhalt
Association football clubs established in 1950
1950 establishments in East Germany